The history of religions school (German: Religionsgeschichtliche Schule) is a term applied to a group of German Protestant theologians associated with the University of Göttingen in the 1890s.

Ideas
The Religionsgeschichtliche Schule used the methodologies of higher criticism, a branch of criticism that investigates the origins of ancient texts in order to understand "the world behind the text." It compared Christianity to other religions, regarding it as one religion among others and rejecting its claims to absolute truth, and demonstrating that it shares characteristics with other religions. It argued that Christianity was not simply the continuation of the Old Testament, but syncretistic, and was rooted in and influenced by Hellenistic Judaism (Philo) and Hellenistic religions like the mystery cults and Gnosticism.

Influence
The school initiated new areas of research into Biblical history and textual analysis. Its influence is also discernable in the Christ myth theory.

Members
The circle included Bernhard Duhm (1873), Albert Eichhorn (1856–1926; 1886), Hermann Gunkel (1888), Johannes Weiss (1888), Wilhelm Bousset (1890), Alfred Rahlfs (1891), Ernst Troeltsch (1891), William Wrede (1891), Heinrich Hackmann (1893), and later Rudolf Otto (1898), Hugo Gressmann (1902) and Wilhelm Heitmüller (1902). Related were Carl Mirbt (1888), Carl Clemen (1892), Heinrich Weinel (1899), and in his early years Paul Wernle (1897). Rudolf Bultmann (1884-1976) may be considered as a third-generation member of this school.

See also
 Gnosticism
 Religions of the ancient Near East

Notes

References

Sources

Printed sources

 
 Kurtz, Paul Michael. Kaiser, Christ, and Canaan: The Religion of Israel in Protestant Germany, 1871–1918. Forschungen zum Alten Testament I/122. Tübingen: Mohr Siebeck, 2018.
 
 

Web-sources

External links
 
 Religionsgeschichtliche Schule, Kurt Rudolph, Encyclopedia of Religion
 Die "Religionsgeschichtliche Schule" (German), University of Göttingen website.

 
school
Religion in ancient history
Religion in ancient Israel and Judah
Christ myth theory